Nur Supriyanto (8 April 1965 – 27 November 2020) was an Indonesian politician.

Biography
He was elected to the West Java Regional People's Representative Council in 2004, 2009, 2014, and 2019. Supriyanto also became deputy speaker for 2009–2014 term.

He died on 27 November 2020, due to COVID-19 in Bekasi.

References

1965 births
2020 deaths
Prosperous Justice Party politicians
Deaths from the COVID-19 pandemic in Indonesia